The Chengdu X-7 Jian Fan (X-7 - Xianji-7 - glider-7) is a Chinese basic trainer glider. First flying in 1966, at least 130 were built.

Design and development

The Chengdu X-7 is a two-seat basic training glider of glass-fibre construction, which first flew in October 1966. It is a high-winged monoplane with the wing braced to the pod-and-boom fuselage by single struts. The crew of two sit in tandem open cockpits, while the undercarriage is a non-retractable monowheel, with nose- and tailskids. 130 had been built by 1980.

Specifications (X-7)

Notes

Glider aircraft
X-7
1960s Chinese aircraft
Chinese sailplanes